Shiv Kumar Beria is an Indian politician and former Minister of Textile and Silk Industry in Akhilesh Yadav's cabinet. He was member of 10th, 11th, 12th, 14th and 16th Vidhan Sabha of Uttar Pradesh representing Rasulabad constituency of Kanpur Dehat district. In January 2022, Beria, a close aide of Samajwadi Party patriarch Mulayam Singh Yadav, joined the Bhartiya Janata Party (BJP), India's ruling party since 2014.

References

Uttar Pradesh politicians
Samajwadi Party politicians
1950 births
Living people
Janata Dal politicians
Pragatisheel Samajwadi Party (Lohiya) politicians